The TUM Institute for Advanced Study (TUM-IAS) is a scientific institution of the Technische Universität München, conducting research in science, engineering and humanities. Its building is located on its Garching campus.

Projects 
The projects are from various fields of research ranging from science and engineering to the humanities. The institute is also supporting the International Expert Group on Earth System Preservation (IESP).

History 
In June 2005, the German federal and state governments agreed on an initiative to promote top-level research in Germany. As a result of extensive evaluation the Technische Universität München was awarded the "elite-status". The TUM Institute for Advanced Study was the core for the concept of this competition. It includes engineering, sciences, industry research and reaches out to the humanities.

External links

Technical University of Munich
Research institutes in Germany